Crime and Punishment in Suburbia (stylized as Crime + Punishment in Suburbia or simply Crime + Punishment) is a 2000 film directed by Rob Schmidt and starring Monica Keena, Ellen Barkin, Michael Ironside, James DeBello and Vincent Kartheiser. The film is a contemporary fable loosely based on Fyodor Dostoyevsky's 1866 novel Crime and Punishment.

Plot
Roseanne is outwardly a perfect and popular teen, but she suffers from a dysfunctional home life. Her mother begins an affair with Chris, a local man, and leaves her to live alone with her alcoholic stepfather Fred. One night during an alcohol-fueled rage, Fred rapes Roseanne.  Traumatized, she decides to take things into her own hands. With the assistance of her devoted and clueless boyfriend Jimmy, she murders her stepfather in retribution. Afterwards, Roseanne's conscience quickly begins to unravel.

The story is narrated by one of Roseanne's classmates, Vincent, a boy who is as concerned with Roseanne's well-being as he is obsessed with her. As the plot develops, he forges a relationship with her, consoling her and giving her advice while trying to point her toward redemption. In the end it becomes possible that he will be her only salvation.

Cast

Production
Rob Schmidt said the film is a very loose adaptation of Fyodor Dostoevsky's novel Crime and Punishment. "The main character kills a terrible person, conceals the crime, is consumed by it, suffers secretly, confesses and in a spiritual way is reborn. It’s just that it takes place in a California high school instead of Siberia," he said. Larry Gross had first written the script in the early 1990s, but it languished on a shelf until a run of high school films became popular in the last half of the decade. The film's original title was Crime and Punishment in High School, but this was changed after the Columbine High massacre happened in 1999.

Critical reception 
On review aggregator Rotten Tomatoes, Crime and Punishment in Suburbia has an approval rating of 21% based on 29 reviews. The critics' consensus reads, "Despite the beautiful visuals, Crime and Punishment is too somber and pretentious. Also, the acting is of mixed quality."

Roger Ebert awarded the film three stars and wrote, "Crime and Punishment in Suburbia is no doubt 'flawed'--that favorite moviecrit word--and it suffers from being released a year after the similar 'American Beauty,' even though it was made earlier. But it is the kind of movie that lives and breathes; I forgive its shortcomings because it strives, and because it contains excellent things."

Time Out said director Rob Schmidt draws out "assured performances from Keena's good-girl-gone-bad and Kartheiser's black-clad loner", but concluded the film is a "rare disappointment from maverick indie producer Christine Vachon" and "this story of festering psychosis beneath the placid surface of everyday US suburbia looks [too] familiar."

Awards
The film was nominated for the Grand Jury Prize for Dramatic Feature at the 2000 Sundance Film Festival.

References

External links
 
 
 
 

2000 films
2000 crime drama films
American crime drama films
2000 independent films
Films scored by Michael Brook
Films about dysfunctional families
Films about murderers
Films based on Crime and Punishment
Films produced by Christine Vachon
Killer Films films
United Artists films
American rape and revenge films
2000 drama films
2000s English-language films
2000s American films